Ghetto Story is the first album released on a major label by the Jamaican dancehall artist Cham, previously known as Baby Cham, released on 15 August 2006.

Track listing

References

2006 debut albums
Baby Cham albums
Madhouse Records albums